Wend may refer to:

 Wends, an ethnic group
 WEnd, the marker for the end of a while loop in some computer languages
 WEND, a modern rock radio station in Charlotte, North Carolina, United States

Given name
 Wend von Wietersheim (1900–1975), German general

Surname
 Chris Wend (born 1987), German sprint canoeist
 Rainer Wend (born 1954), German politician

See also
 Wend Valley
 Wendy

Ethnonymic surnames